Casanova Historic District is a national historic district located at Casanova, Fauquier County, Virginia.  It encompasses 32 contributing buildings in the rural crossroads of Casanova.  They include a variety of late-19th and early-20th century dwellings, the former Casanova Store, a two-story stone mill converted to a dwelling, the Gothic Revival style Grace Church Parish Hall, a former school, and a former garage converted to a post office in the 1950s.

It was listed on the National Register of Historic Places in 2005.

References

Historic districts in Fauquier County, Virginia
National Register of Historic Places in Fauquier County, Virginia
Historic districts on the National Register of Historic Places in Virginia